"Get It On" is a song by the English rock band T. Rex, featured on their 1971 album Electric Warrior. Written by frontman Marc Bolan, "Get It On" was the second chart-topper for T. Rex on the UK Singles Chart. In the United States, it was retitled "Bang a Gong (Get It On)" to avoid confusion with a song of the same name by the group Chase.

History
Following the success of T. Rex's single, "Hot Love", the band went on a United States tour. While in New York in March 1971, Bolan asked drummer Bill Legend to help him brainstorm drum patterns for a song idea that would later become "Get It On". Bolan claimed to have written the song out of his desire to record Chuck Berry's "Little Queenie", and said that the riff was taken from the Berry tune. In fact, a slightly edited line (And meanwhile, I'm still thinking) from "Little Queenie" is said at the fade of "Get It On". According to producer Tony Visconti, this line was an unscripted ad-lib by Bolan during recording.

This was the song that virtually ended the once-solid friendship between Bolan and John Peel, after Peel made clear his lack of enthusiasm for it on air after playing his advance white label copy. Bolan and Peel only spoke once more before the former's death in 1977.

The track was recorded at Trident Studios, London, and the piano on the record was performed by either Rick Wakeman or Blue Weaver. Mark Paytress notes that both pianists may have played separate parts on the song, with Wakeman contributing only the piano glissandos that feature several times throughout the song. Wakeman, who was desperate for work at the time to pay his rent, had bumped into Bolan in Oxford Street, who offered him the session. Wakeman pointed out to Tony Visconti that the record did not actually need a piano player. Visconti suggested that he could add a gliss. Wakeman said that Visconti could do that, to which Bolan replied, "You want your rent, don't you?"  Wakeman did, and earned £9 for his efforts.

Saxophones were played by Ian McDonald of King Crimson. Producer Visconti later recalled: "He played all the saxes, one baritone and two altos. I kept the baritone separate but bounced the altos to one track. I bounced the backup vocals to two tracks, making an interesting stereo image." Mark Volman and Howard Kaylan (formerly The Turtles) provided back up vocals.

During a December 1971 Top of the Pops performance, Elton John mimed a piano on the song. This performance is usually the video clip for the song which has aired on various music-video outlets such as VH1 Classic.

Track listing
US: Reprise / 1032
UK: Fly Records / BUG 10
Germany: Ariola / 10 327 AT
Denmark: Stateside / 6E 006-92700
France: Columbia / CBS 7393 (without "There Was a Time")

 "Get It On" (Marc Bolan) – 4:25
 "There Was a Time" (Marc Bolan) – 1:00
 "Raw Ramp" (Marc Bolan) – 4:14

Personnel

T. Rex 
Marc Bolan – lead vocals, guitar
Rick Wakeman – piano, hammond organ 
Ian McDonald – baritone and alto saxophones
Steve Currie – bass
Bill Legend – drums, tambourine
Mark Volman, Howard Kaylan – backing vocals

Chart performance
It spent four weeks at the top in the UK, starting 24 July 1971 ("Hot Love" was number one for six weeks from March to May), and it was the group's biggest hit overall, with Bolan claiming that it sold a million. It peaked on the US Billboard Hot 100 chart at #10 and at #12 in the Cash Box Top 100 in March 1972, becoming the band's only major US hit. The song reached No. 12 in Canada in March 1972.

Weekly charts

Year-end charts

Certifications

The Power Station version

"Get It On" was covered by the Power Station in 1985. Their version – referred to as "Get It On (Bang a Gong)" in the US – was released as their second single from their debut album. The track was a strong hit on the US Billboard Hot 100 chart, where the single peaked at number nine (one place higher than the original) in the summer of 1985. Meanwhile, in the UK, the song reached number 22 on the UK Singles Chart. When Robert Palmer heard that the other Power Station members had recorded demos of the song, he asked to try out vocals for it. Before long, the band had decided to record the entire album with Palmer. This single, along with "Some Like It Hot", became The Power Station's signature songs.

On 13 July 1985, the Power Station (as well as Duran Duran), had a participation at Live Aid, on the Philadelphia concert, in which the band performed the song, this time with the British singer Michael Des Barres on vocals.

The female dancer featured in the video is American dancer/singer-songwriter Sara Carlson.

The song also was performed live with Michael Des Barres on vocals, in the Miami Vice episode "Whatever Works", which featured all of the then-touring group in cameo roles.

Track listings

7" vinyl single
 US: Capitol Records / B-5479
 UK: Parlophone / R 6096
 Australia: EMI / A1510
 Europe: EMI / 20 0632 7

12" vinyl single
 US: Capitol Records / V8646
 UK: Parlophone / 12R 6096
 Europe: Parlophone / 1C K 060 20 0631 6
 Canada: Capitol Records / V 75107

Charts

Other cover versions
 Blondie recorded a live version of the song on 4 November 1978 at The Paradise Ballroom in Boston, MA, which can be found on their 1978 live album, Headlines, and also on the 2001 reissue of Parallel Lines.
 In 1979, studio disco group Witch Queen released a disco version of the song, titled, "Bang A Gong". It peaked at number eight on the disco charts.
 In 2020 U2 covered the song, with Elton John on piano.

Sampling and references
British dance act Bus Stop (known in the US as "London Bus Stop") sampled the vocals from the T. Rex original in their 2000 pseudo-cover of the song, which charted at No. 59 in the UK.

See also
 List of 1970s one-hit wonders in the United States

References

1971 singles
1979 singles
1985 singles
T. Rex (band) songs
The Power Station (band) songs
UK Singles Chart number-one singles
Irish Singles Chart number-one singles
Songs written by Marc Bolan
Song recordings produced by Tony Visconti
Song recordings produced by Bernard Edwards
1971 songs
Fly Records singles
Reprise Records singles
Parlophone singles